Rankin Hall, also known as the Administration Building'' and Chapel of Tarkio College''' is a historic building located on the campus of the former Tarkio College at Tarkio, Atchison County, Missouri. It was built in 1930–1931, and is a 3 1/2-story, "T"-shaped, Collegiate Gothic style brick and stone building.  The building measures 144 feet wide and extends 141 feet deep.  It features steep projecting gables with stepped parapets, numerous pointed arch windows, buttresses, and a mix of limestone and cast stone trim.  The building served as the Presbyterian college's administration building and chapel.

It was listed on the National Register of Historic Places in 2010.

References

University and college buildings on the National Register of Historic Places in Missouri
Collegiate Gothic architecture in Missouri
School buildings completed in 1931
Buildings and structures in Atchison County, Missouri
National Register of Historic Places in Atchison County, Missouri